The president of the National Assembly of the Republic of the Congo is the presiding officer of the lower chamber of the legislature of Republic of the Congo.

References
 Official website

National Assembly
Republic of the Congo, National Assembly
 
1958 establishments in the Republic of the Congo